Jean-François Rodriguez (born 19 December 1957) is a French former professional racing cyclist. He rode in four editions of the Tour de France and two editions of the Giro d'Italia.

References

External links
 

1957 births
Living people
French male cyclists
People from Tarascon
Sportspeople from Bouches-du-Rhône
Cyclists from Provence-Alpes-Côte d'Azur